Julia Brystiger (née Prajs, born 25 November 1902, in Stryj – died 9 November 1975, in Warsaw) was a Polish communist activist and member of the security apparatus in Stalinist Poland. She was also known as Julia Brystygier, Bristiger, Brustiger, Briestiger, Brystygierowa, Bristigierowa, and by her nicknames – given by the victims of torture: Luna, Bloody Luna, Daria, Ksenia, and Maria. The nickname Bloody Luna was a direct reference of her Gestapo-like methods during interrogations. Her pen name was Julia Preiss. She was the author of several books.

Life 
Brystiger was the daughter of a Jewish pharmacist from Stryj (now Ukraine). In 1920 she graduated from high school in Lwów (new Second Polish Republic) and married a Zionist activist Natan (Nathan) Brystiger. She studied history at the Lwów University while pregnant and a year later gave birth to a son, Michał Bristiger.

After graduating from University, Brystiger went to Paris where she continued her education, receiving a PhD in philosophy. Upon their return, in 1928–1929, she got a job at a high school in Vilnius and in a Jewish Teacher's College Tarbuch. Since 1927, she was an active participant in the communist movement, and in 1929 was fired because of her communist agitation. Working for the Communist Party of Poland, she was arrested several times, and in 1937 was sentenced to 2 years in prison.

Stalinist agent

After the German and Soviet attack on Poland, Brystiger escaped to Samarkand, accepted Soviet citizenship and became an active member of the Soviet political administration. She created the so-called Committee of Political Prisoners, which helped the NKVD to imprison several members of the prewar Polish opposition movements. She was "denouncing people on such scale, that she antagonized even Communist party members". Ironically, at one point Brystiger oversaw the interrogation and persecution of Bela and Józef Goldberg – her future colleague, the UB interrogator known as Józef Różański. Różańskis had committed "a crime" of accepting Western food-aid in the form of two kilograms of rice and a bag of flour from the Polish Government in Exile's embassy, in order to save their daughter from starvation. A few years later, Józef Różański joined the NKVD and eventually, became a high ranking functionary in the Polish secret police. He ended up working alongside Brystiger – his former interrogator – in the Ministry of Public Security of Poland under Stalinism.

Following German Operation Barbarossa Brystiger fled to Kharkov, then to Samarkand deep in the USSR. In 1943-44, she worked for the Union of Polish Patriots, and in October 1944, joined the new Polish Workers' Party. In December 1944, after returning behind the Soviet front, Brystygier began working for the infamous Ministry of Public Security of Poland, where she soon got promoted to the rank of Director of the Fifth Department created in July 1946 specifically for the purpose of persecution and torture of Polish religious personalities. Her career is believed to have been so rapid also because she was intimate with such high functionaries as Jakub Berman and Hilary Minc. In the Polish official archives, there is an instruction written by Brystygier to her subordinates, about the purpose of torture:

In fact, the Polish intelligentsia as such is against the Communist system and basically, it is impossible to re-educate it. All that remains is to liquidate it. However, since we must not repeat the mistake of the Russians after the 1917 revolution, when all intelligentsia members were exterminated, and the country did not develop correctly afterwards, we have to create such a system of terror and pressure that the members of the intelligentsia would not dare to be politically active.

Brystiger personally oversaw the first stages of each UB investigation at her place of employment. She would torture the captured persons using her own methods such as whipping male victims' genitals. One of her victims was a man named Szafarzyński – from the Olsztyn office of the Polish People's Party – who died as a result of interrogation carried out by Brystygier. One of the victims of her interrogation methods testified later: "She is a murderous monster, worse than German female guards of the concentration camps". Anna Roszkiewicz–Litwiniwiczowa, a former soldier of the Home Army, said about Brystygier: "She was famous for her sadistic tortures; she seemed to have been obsessed with sadistic treatment of genitalia and was fulfilling her libido in that way.".

Brystiger became the head of the 5th Department of UB sometime in the late 1940s. It specialized in the persecution of Polish religious leaders. Brystygier – a dogmatic Marxist – yearned to destroy all religion as an "opiate of the masses". She directed the operation to arrest and detain the Primate of Poland, Cardinal Stefan Wyszyński. The decision to arrest him had been made earlier in Moscow. Brystygier took an active part in the "war against religion" in the 1950s, during which 123 Roman Catholic priests were imprisoned in 1950 alone.  She also persecuted other congregations, such as the 2,000 jailed Jehovah's Witnesses. Julia Brystygier left the Ministry of Public Security (UB) in 1956 and tried to become a writer, authoring a novel "Crooked Letters". She worked in a publishing house under Jewish communist Jerzy Borejsza (Różański's brother), and was a frequent visitor to a boarding school for the vision impaired, in a village near Warsaw.

Works 
 Krzywe litery (1960)
 Znak "H" : opowiadania (1962)
 Przez ucho igielne (1965)

See also
 History of Poland: Stalinist era (1948–1956)
 Michał Bristiger, Julia Brystygier's son (in Polish Wikipedia)
 film Zaćma, inspired by the life of Julia Bristigierowa.

References

1902 births
1975 deaths
People from Stryi
People from the Kingdom of Galicia and Lodomeria
Ukrainian Jews
Austro-Hungarian Jews
Jews from Galicia (Eastern Europe)
Communist Party of Poland politicians
Polish Workers' Party politicians
Polish United Workers' Party members
Members of the State National Council
Ministry of Public Security (Poland) officials
Jewish socialists
Polish Roman Catholics
Converts to Roman Catholicism from atheism or agnosticism
Polish emigrants to the Soviet Union